Atanas Hranov is a Bulgarian painter and sculptor.

Life and career 
Atanas Hranov was born in Plovdiv on October 11, 1961. He studied at the National Arts School in Kotel (1980) and graduated from Prof. Anton Donchev's Woodcarving class at the National Academy of Arts in Sofia in 1987.

Hranov's works range from sculpture to painting, often representing an organic fusion of genres. His preferred materials include wood, handmade paper, canvas, bronze, silver, and polymer coated metal structures. Hranov has held more than 60 solo exhibitions and taken part in numerous group initiatives and curatorial projects.

He is involved in joint projects with poets Vesselin Sariev and Alexander Sekulov.

Hranov lives and works in Plovdiv.

Works of his are held at the National Art Gallery in Sofia, many other museums across Bulgaria, and private collections in Bulgaria and elsewhere.

Atanas Hranov is an avid seafarer.

Solo exhibitions 

 1992 – Ata-Ray Gallery, Sofia, Bulgaria
 1993 – Center of contemporary art Bania Starinna, Plovdiv, Bulgaria
 1993 – Institut Français, Sofia, Bulgaria
 1993 – Gallery 88, Luxembourg
 1994 – Center of contemporary art Bania Starinna, Plovdiv, Bulgaria
 1994 – Ata-Ray Gallery, Sofia, Bulgaria
 1995 – Gallery 88, Luxembourg
 1995 – Dosev Gallery, Sofia, Bulgaria
 1996 – Dyakov Gallery, Plovdiv, Bulgaria
 1996 – Lucas Gallery, Plovdiv, Bulgaria
 1996 – Ata-Ray Gallery, Sofia, Bulgaria
 1997 – Lucas Gallery, Plovdiv, Bulgaria
 1997 – Ata-Ray Gallery, Sofia, Bulgaria
 1997 – Melina Mercouri Gallery, Hydra, Greece
 1999 – Ata-Ray Gallery, Sofia, Bulgaria
 1999 – Dyakov Gallery, Plovdiv, Bulgaria
 1999 – Lucas Gallery, Plovdiv, Bulgaria
 2000 – Lucas Gallery, Plovdiv, Bulgaria
 2000 – Artin Gallery, Varna, Bulgaria
 2001 – Dyakov Gallery, Plovdiv, Bulgaria
 2001 – Gallery 88, Luxembourg
 2001 – Art 36 Gallery, Sofia, Bulgaria
 2002 – Dyakov Gallery, Plovdiv, Bulgaria
 2002 – Yuka Gallery, Varna, Bulgaria
 2003 – Dyakov Gallery, Plovdiv, Bulgaria
 2003 – Prolet Gallery, Burgas, Bulgaria
 2003 – Naturelle Gallery, Munich, Germany
 2004 – Dyakov Gallery, Plovdiv, Bulgaria
 2004 – Naturelle Gallery, Munich, Germany
 2005 – Plovdiv City Art Gallery, Bulgaria
 2005 – Fragmenti, George Papazov Gallery, Plovdiv, Bulgaria
 2005 – Prolet Gallery, Burgas, Bulgaria
 2006 – A Page from a Passport and a Little Hand Luggage, Rakursi Gallery, Sofia, Bulgaria
 2006 – Yuka Gallery, Varna, Bulgaria
 2006 – George Papazov Gallery, Plovdiv, Bulgaria
 2007 – George Papazov Gallery, Plovdiv, Bulgaria
 2007 – The Little Female Saints of Valparaiso, Rakursi Gallery, Sofia, Bulgaria
 2007 – Yuka Gallery, Varna, Bulgaria
 2007 – Prolet Gallery, Burgas, Bulgaria
 2008 – George Papazov Gallery, Plovdiv, Bulgaria
 2008 – Fragments from my Room, Rakursi Gallery, Sofia, Bulgaria
 2009 – The Astronomy of Cherries, Rakursi Gallery, Sofia, Bulgaria
 2009 – Prolet Gallery, Burgas, Bulgaria
 2010 – Curriculum Vitae, Rakursi Gallery, Sofia, Bulgaria
 2010 – The Seventh Hill, Resonance Gallery, Plovdiv, Bulgaria
 2010 – The Land of Dreams, Le Papillon Gallery, Varna, Bulgaria
 2011 – The History of Halos, Rakursi Gallery, Sofia, Bulgaria
 2011 – The Seventh Hill Project, Plovdiv, Bulgaria
 2012 – Both Your Faces I Love, Rakursi Gallery, Sofia, Bulgaria
 2012 – Little Favourite Portraits, Eva's Gallery, Varna, Bulgaria
 2013 – Gallery 88, Luxembourg
 2013 – A Voyage to the Isla Negra, Rakursi Gallery, Sofia, Bulgaria
 2013 – Paintings, L'Union Gallery, Plovdiv, Bulgaria
 2014 – Seducing the Orient, L'Union Gallery, Plovdiv, Bulgaria
 2014 – The Summer of my Bays, Rakursi Gallery, Sofia, Bulgaria
 2014 – The Boris Christoff Project, Plovdiv, Bulgaria
 2014 – Prolet Gallery, Burgas, Bulgaria
 2015 – The Chaldeans, Rakursi Gallery, Sofia, Bulgaria
 2015 – A Return to Chaldea, Le Papillon Gallery, Varna, Bulgaria
 2016 – Balthazar's Kettles, Rakursi Gallery, Sofia, Bulgaria
 2016 – Balthazar's Diaries, Philippopolis Gallery, Plovdiv, Bulgaria
 2017 – The Clear Outlines of Mr. H., Rakursi Gallery, Sofia, Bulgaria
 2017 – Portraits from a Journey, Le Papillon Gallery, Varna, Bulgaria
2017 – Paintings, U PARK Gallery, Plovdiv, Bulgaria
2018 – Breakfast in the Studio, Rakursi Gallery, Sofia, Bulgaria
2018 – Probable Landscape, Prolet Gallery, Burgas, Bulgaria
 2018 – Paintings, Philippopolis Gallery, Plovdiv, Bulgaria

Group exhibitions and projects 

 1992 – 100 Gallery, Malta
 1994 – Burgwedel Gallery, Burgwedel, Germany
 1994 – De Leile Gallery, Antwerp, Belgium
 1994 – Art Expo, Budapest, Hungary
 1995 – Oh, Gods, Art 36 Gallery, Sofia, Bulgaria
 1996 – The Man and the Document, Center of contemporary art Bania Starinna, Plovdiv, Bulgaria
 1997 – Bulgarian Art, Kuwait
 1997 – Campo & Campo, Antwerp, Belgium
 1999 – Dublin, Ireland
 1999 – Gorcum Museum, Gorinchem, Netherlands
 2001 – Spirit and Matters – August in Art, Georgi Velchev Art Museum, Varna
 2002 – Vinizki Gallery, Munich, Germany
 2003 – ″K″ Gallery, Munich, Germany
 2003 – 10/5/3 – Painting and Matters, National Exhibition Center for Contemporary Art, Sofia
 2004 – Re-Paper, Sariev Gallery, Plovdiv, Bulgaria
 2004 – Don Quixote, George Papazov Gallery, Plovdiv, Bulgaria
 2004 – ″K″ Gallery, Munich, Germany
 2004 – Slapansky & Slapansky Gallery, Munich, Germany
 2004 - Schloss von Hohenstein Gallery, Germany
 2005 – Salzburg Gallery, Salzburg München Bank, Munich, Germany
 2005 – City and Colour, Rakursi Gallery, Sofia, Bulgaria
 2005 – Primitivism and Tradition, National Autumn Exhibitions
 2005 – Classics – Contemporaries – Future Artists, Aspect Gallery, Plovdiv, Bulgaria
 2005 – Nasko H. Stories involving Rum, Ginger, Raisins, and Honey: a collection of paintings and stories (with poet Alexander Sekulov)
 2006 – Classics – Contemporaries – Future Artists, Aspect Gallery, #2007 – Nasko H. The Little Female Saints and the Black Pepper Men: a collection of paintings and stories (with poet Alexander Sekulov)
 2008 – The Floating City and the Black Pepper Men (with poet Alexander Sekulov), the Ministry of Foreign Affairs Travelling Exhibition, Apollonia Arts Festival 2008
 2008 – The Cyrillic Script Project, European Parliament, Brussels
 2009 – The Bulgarian Culture Days in Russia, Manege, Moscow
 2011 – The Fourth of Plovdiv, Eva's Gallery, Varna, Bulgaria
 2012 – Entirely Useful Things (with poet Alexander Sekulov), Rakursi Gallery, Sofia, Bulgaria
 2012 – Pushkin & Plyushkin. Collecting House for Entirely Useful Things (with poet Alexander Sekulov), Eva's Gallery, Varna, Bulgaria
 2016 – Friends of the Sea Contemporary Art Biennale, Burgas, Bulgaria

Awards 
 2001 – Plovdiv Arts Award
 2004 – Dyakov Gallery Award
 2007 – ″Amethyst Rose″ Award for High Artistic Achievements
 2016 – Friends of the Sea Contemporary Art Biennale Painting Award, Burgas

Sources

External links 
 
 Atanas Hranov and Balthazar’s Kettles, YouTube, March 16, 2016
 Balthazar’s Kettles: Exhibition for Dreamers, Bulgarian National Radio, March 28, 2016
 Atanas Hranov: Time is not Money but Instants of Joy, an interview by Maria Lutsova, Maritsa Daily, October 14, 2016
 Atanas Hranov Invites to a Breakfast in the Studio, YouTube, April 18, 2018

20th-century Bulgarian painters
20th-century male artists
Modern painters
1961 births
Artists from Plovdiv
Living people
Male painters